Miller Peak is a peak,  high, located  south of Mount Ford in the Explorers Range of the Bowers Mountains, Antarctica. It was explored by the northern party of the New Zealand Geological Survey Antarctic Expedition of 1963–64, and was named for J.H. "Bob" Miller, the leader-surveyor of that party.

References

Mountains of Victoria Land
Pennell Coast